The Canichana people are an ethnic group in the Beni Department of Bolivia. There were 899 of them in 2012. 1,253 people speak the Canichana language natively.

References

Ethnic groups in Bolivia
Beni Department